Wiki Indaba is an official conference of the Wikimedia Foundation with interest in African content. Topics of presentation and dialogue include Wikimedia projects such as Wikipedia, other wikis, open-source software, free knowledge, free content and how these projects affect the African continent.

Covid-19 impact
Before the Covid 19 pandemic, affiliate usergroups selected to host the conference would organise to host it in-person. However since the onset of Covid 19 the format has changed to hybrid where participants can attend both online and physical. Uganda was the recent affiliate country to host it solely online in 2021 which saw the numbers of participants double from when it hosted in person.

Overview

See also

 WikiAfrica
 WikiConference India
 WikiConference North America
 Wikipedia Summit India
 WikiSym
 Wikimania

References

2014 establishments in South Africa
Wikimedia Foundation
Wiki-related conferences
Recurring events established in 2014